William Gallacher was a Scottish professional association footballer who played as an inside forward. He played four games for Burnley in the English Football League in the 1919–20 season.

References

Year of birth unknown
Sportspeople from Clydebank
Footballers from West Dunbartonshire
Scottish footballers
Association football inside forwards
Burnley F.C. players
English Football League players
Year of death missing
Renton F.C. players